Vaidyanath Jyotirlinga temple, also known as Baba dham and Baidyanath dham is one of the twelve Jyotirlingas, the most sacred abodes of Shiva. The location of Vaidyanath Jyotirlinga is disputed. The claimed locations are:
Vaidyanath Jyotirlinga, Deoghar, Jharkhand
Shri Vaijnath Temple, Parli, Maharashtra
Baijnath temple, Baijnath, Himachal Pradesh

In Dwadasa jyothirlinga sthothram, Adi Sankaracharya has praised Vaidyanath jyothirlinga in following verses,

Poorvothare prajwalika nidhane
sada vasantham girija sametham
surasuraradhitha padapadmam
srivaidyanatham thamaham namami

Sourashtre Somanadham, cha Sri Shaile Mallikarjunam,
Ujjayinyam Maha Kalam, Omkaram, amaleshwaram,
Paralyam Vaidyanatham, cha Dakinyam Bhimasankaram,
Sethubandhe thu Ramesam, Nagesam thu Darukavane,
Varanasyam thu Viswesam, Trayambakam Gouthami thate,
Himalaye thu Kedaram, Ghushmesam cha Shivalaye,
Ethani Jyothirlingani sayam pratha paden nara,
Saptha janma krutham papam smaranena vinasyathi.

Above main verse location 
"Parlam Vaidyanatham" as above verses  it is clear"parlam" is location of sri Vaidyanatham.

 Vaidyanath Jyotirlinga, Deoghar, Jharkhand

But  Parlam Vaidyanatham" main verse close to Shri Vaijnath Temple Parli, Maharashtra which is today at Beed. both are disputed location still now government of India didn't confirmed as any of original. Also Chidabhoomi indicates that, in olden days, this was a funeral place, where corpses are burnt and post-death ceremonies were performed. This place could have been a centre of tantric cults like Kapalika/Bhairava where Shiva is worshipped significantly as smasan vasin (meaning, residing in crematorium), sava bhasma bhushita (meaning, smearing body with ashes of burnt bodies).

This Śloka is true but the reference is for North East part of this Āryāvarta by which Baidyanath Dham is in northern region.

References

Jyotirlingas